is a town located in Yosa District, Kyoto, Japan.

Geography
Yosano is located in the northern part of Kyoto Prefecture at the base of the Tango Peninsula.  The Nodagawa River runs through most of the town south to north leading to the Miyazu Bay, and the Ama-no-Hashidate. The closest cities are Fukuchiyama to the south and Toyooka to the west, both about 45 minutes by car. The town is around 2 and a half hours north of Kyoto, Osaka, Himeji and Kobe.

Neighboring municipalities
Kyoto Prefecture
Fukuchiyama
Miyazu
 Kyōtango
Hyōgo Prefecture
Toyooka

Climate
Yosano has a Humid subtropical climate (Köppen Cfa) characterized by warm summers and cool winters with light to no snowfall.  The average annual temperature in Yosano is 13.4 °C. The average annual rainfall is 1807 mm with September as the wettest month. The temperatures are highest on average in August, at around 25.4 °C, and lowest in January, at around 2.1 °C.

Demographics
Per Japanese census data, the population of Yosano peaked around 1970 and has declined since.

History
The area of the modern town of Yosano was within ancient Tango Province, and the place name of "Yosa" dates from records of the early 8th century.  In the Edo Period, it was part of the area was controlled by Miyazu Domain. The town of Kaya and villages of Yosano and Iwataki  were established within Yosa District with the creation of the modern municipalities system on April 1, 1889.  On April 1, 1921 Iwataki was raised to town status. On December 1, 1954 Yosano merged with Kaya. On March 1, 1955, five villages merged to form the town of Nodagawa. Kaya, Iwataki and Nodagawa merged to form the town of Yosano on March 1, 2006.

Government
Yosano has a mayor-council form of government with a directly elected mayor and a unicameral town council of 16 members. Yosano, together with the city of Miyazu contributes one member to the Kyoto Prefectural Assembly. In terms of national politics, the town is part of Kyoto 5th district of the lower house of the Diet of Japan.

Economy
Yosano has a mixed economy of agriculture and textiles. A type of crêpe fabric called Tango chirimen has bene a famous local product since the Edo period.

Education
Yosano has six public elementary schools and three public middle schools operated by the town government and one public high school operated by the Kyoto Prefectural Department of Education. The prefecture also operates one vocational training school, the Kyoto Prefectural Nursing School.

Transportation

Railway
 Kyoto Tango Railway – Miyazu Line

Highway

Local attractions
Chirimen Kaido (designated National Preservation District for traditional buildings)

National Historic Sites
Ebisuyama Kofun
Hiyoshigaoka - Akashi Tumuli
Shirageyama Kofun
Tsukuriyama Kofun

References

External links

Yosano official website

Towns in Kyoto Prefecture
Yosano, Kyoto
Populated coastal places in Japan